Lions Eye Hospital – Butwal was established in November 1996. It is located at Lions Chowk, Butwal-4, Rupandehi district, Nepal.

The hospital is running in its own building constructed by the Lions Club of Butwal. The hospital has 40 beds and 29 staff members.

History
Initially, the hospital was supported by Lumbini Eye Institute (LEI) providing visiting services twice a week. In 2008, the local supporters of Lions Club of Butwal and LEI signed a MOU to support and provide surgical services at the hospital.

Services
The hospital provides following services
 OPD examination
 Refraction service
 Cataract and other surgeries
 ophthalmologist service
 Spectacles sales service ( low cost)
 medicine sales
 Diagnostic screening camps
 School children screening camps
 Eye care awareness training and programs

References

External links
 Nepal Netra Jyoti Sangh

Hospitals in Nepal
Eye hospitals
1996 establishments in Nepal